Fringeworthy is a role-playing game first published in 1982 by Tri Tac Games. In 1984, a second edition saw a print run of 4000 and new expanded version was released in 1992. Fringeworthy is famous for being the first alternate history adventure role-playing game ever published.  In 2009, Tri Tac Games released a d20 Modern edition.

Setting
2013: A Japanese research team in the Antarctic finds a gateway to Alien and Alternate Earths. Sayuri Tanuma became the first known Fringeworthy, a person with the special ability that lets one use the Fringepaths.  She explored our local system and our nearest Alternate Earths, meeting an alien named Schmert.

The United Nations forms the United Nations Interdimensional Survey Service (UNISS) along with IDET (Inter-Dimensional Exploration Teams) to oversee the administration of the Fringepaths and their exploration. As a member of IDET, characters help explore other worlds, help other alternate worlds with their problems, and face down the menaces that exist on the Fringepaths.  Players play characters with the 1-in-100,000 ability to use the equipment left behind by a race named the Tehrmelern. They created the pathways, called the fringes, that lead to other worlds and other places.

The Mellor are a species of shape-changers, engineered by the Tehrmelern to aid in their undetected study and social uplift of other beings. Centuries ago, the Mellor became infected by some mysterious force that turned them to a path of indiscriminate genocide. As of 2013, they have nearly eradicated the Tehrmelern and have wiped out entire worlds of other races. They are a cunning and implacable enemy.

Original system
The game was written by Tri Tac Games founder Richard Tucholka, one of the creators of the game called The Morrow Project.  He based it on a series of unpublished science fiction stories he wrote in the '70s.  The original game system uses Tri Tac's Classic combat/rules model which is highly detailed.  The game system makes it possible to use real weapons in the game as long as basic stats are known about the weapon, so an issue of Guns and Ammo magazine or Jane's Defence Weekly can be used as a Tri Tac game supplement.

Character creation, like combat, in the Classic Edition, is highly "granular", with 15 basic attribute scores and between 6 and 19 secondary abilities and skills, many of which may be moderated by an Education Type attribute.

Fringeworthy
Fringeworthy Classic, Fringeworthy, Fringeworthy d20

 Portals 1  Catalogue of Alternative Worlds,
 Portals 2  Catalogue of Alternative Worlds,
 Portals 3  Explorers Notebook,
 Portals 4  War on the Fringepaths

Related
Rogue 417, Cloisters, Invasion US, Weirdzone, Hardwired Hinterland

Reception
William A. Barton reviewed Fringeworthy in Space Gamer No. 65. Barton commented that "Fringeworthy I view as the most innovative of the recent new RP systems for its first-of-its-kind alternate worlds theme. I believe it to be deserving of an award of some sort for creativity and innovation."

Reviews
Challenge #67 (December 1992)
White Wolf #35 (March/April, 1993)
Review in Shadis #17

References

External links
Fringeworthy podcast
Fringeworthy homepage
Fringeworthy forums
Fringeworthy on RPG.net
Fringeworthy fansite

Alternate history role-playing games
Role-playing games introduced in 1982
Science fiction role-playing games
Tri Tac Games games